Wesley Roberts may refer to:

 C. Wesley Roberts (1902–1976), Kansas businessman and Chairman of the Republican National Committee
 Wesley Roberts (swimmer) (born 1997), Cook Islands swimmer